The Great Britain Superficial Deposits Supergroup is a Neogene to Quaternary lithostratigraphic supergroup (a sequence of rock strata or other definable geological units) present across Great Britain and the Isle of Man. It includes all of the natural superficial deposits found in Great Britain and comprises the Albion Glacigenic Group, Britannia Catchments Group, British Coastal Deposits Group, Caledonia Glacigenic Group, Crag Group, Dunwich Group and Residual Deposits Group. These deposits include  till, sands, gravels, silts, head, clay, peat and other materials.

References 

Geological groups of the United Kingdom
Quaternary geologic formations
Neogene System of Europe
Geology of England
Geology of Scotland
Geology of Wales